Ralls Independent School District is a public school district based in Ralls, Texas (USA).

In 2009, the school district was rated "academically acceptable" by the Texas Education Agency.

Schools
Ralls High School (Grades 9-12)
Ralls Middle School (Grades 6-8)
Ralls Elementary School (Grades PK-5)

References

External links
Ralls ISD

School districts in Crosby County, Texas